Pternoscirta is a genus of grasshoppers in the family Acrididae, subfamily Oedipodinae and tribe Locustini. The recorded distribution of species includes: India, China, Indochina and Malesia.

Species
The Orthoptera Species File includes:
 Pternoscirta bimaculata (Thunberg, 1815) – a "temporary name" - Indian Subcontinent
 Pternoscirta caliginosa (Haan, 1842) - China, Vietnam, W. Malesia
 Pternoscirta cinctifemur (Walker, 1859) - type species, locality Sri Lanka
 Pternoscirta longipennis Xia, 1981 - China
 Pternoscirta pulchripes Uvarov, 1925 - China, Thailand
 Pternoscirta sauteri (Karny, 1915) - Vietnam, Taiwan
 Pternoscirta villosa (Thunberg, 1815) - China

Note: A binomial authority in parentheses indicates that the species was originally described in a genus other than Pternoscirta.

References

External links
Image of Pternoscirta caliginosa (Haan, 1842) Biodiversity of Singapore

Acrididae genera
Invertebrates of Southeast Asia
Oedipodinae